Baeckea uncinella is a species of flowering plant in the family Myrtaceae and is endemic to the south coast of Western Australia. It is a shrub with narrowly egg-shaped to linear leaves and small white flowers with seven to thirteen stamens.

Description

Taxonomy
Baeckea uncinella was first formally described in 1867 by George Bentham in Flora Australiensis from specimens collected by George Maxwell east of Stokes Inlet.

In 2021, Barbara Lynette Rye changed the name to Austrobaeckea uncinella, but the name has not yet been accepted by the Australian Plant Census.

Distribution and habitat
This baeckea grows near watercourses and salt lakes between the Young River and Mount Heywood north of Esperance, in the Esperance Plains and Mallee biogeographic regions of southern Western Australia.

Conservation status
Baeckea uncinella is classified as "Priority Three" by the Government of Western Australia Department of Biodiversity, Conservation and Attractions, meaning that it is poorly known and known from only a few locations but is not under imminent threat.

See also
List of Baeckea species

References

Flora of Western Australia
uncinella
Plants described in 1867
Taxa named by George Bentham